Josh Simpson may refer to:

 Josh Simpson (Australian footballer) (born 1994), Australian footballer for the Fremantle Football Club
 Josh Simpson (Canadian soccer) (born 1983), Canadian soccer player
 Josh Simpson (English footballer) (born 1987), English footballer
 Josh Simpson (glass artist) (born 1949), American glass artist
 Josh Simpson (baseball) (born 1997), American baseball player